Dam Ab or Dam-e Ab or Domab may refer to:
 Dam Ab, Ardal, Chaharmahal and Bakhtiari Province
 Dam Ab, Kiar, Chaharmahal and Bakhtiari Province
 Dam Ab, Lordegan, Chaharmahal and Bakhtiari Province
 Domab, Isfahan
 Dam Ab, Bagh-e Malek, Khuzestan Province
 Dam Ab, Masjed Soleyman, Khuzestan Province